Mary Grigson (born 3 June 1971) is an Australian cross-country mountain biker.

Grigson participated in the 1996 Summer Olympics in Atlanta coming 15th in the women's Cross-country event. She also competed in the women's Cross-country event at the 2000 Summer Olympics in Sydney where she came 6th.

She won a bronze medal at the 2002 Commonwealth Games in the cross-country event.

She was inducted into the Cycling Australia Hall of Fame in 2016.

References

Living people
1971 births
Sportspeople from Wellington City
Australian female cyclists
Olympic cyclists of Australia
Cyclists at the 1996 Summer Olympics
Cyclists at the 2000 Summer Olympics
Cyclists at the 2002 Commonwealth Games
Commonwealth Games bronze medallists for Australia
Commonwealth Games medallists in cycling
Australian mountain bikers
20th-century Australian women
21st-century Australian women
Medallists at the 2002 Commonwealth Games